Vitaliy Chernobai (23 May 1929 – 19 May 2019) was a Ukrainian athlete. He competed in the men's pole vault at the 1956 Summer Olympics, representing the Soviet Union.

References

1929 births
2019 deaths
Athletes (track and field) at the 1956 Summer Olympics
Ukrainian male pole vaulters
Olympic athletes of the Soviet Union
Place of birth missing
Soviet male pole vaulters